Bruce Hamilton may refer to:

Bruce Hamilton (writer) (1900–1974), English novelist
Bruce Hamilton (British Army officer) (1857–1936), British general
Bruce Hamilton (cricketer) (born 1932), New Zealand cricketer
Bruce Hamilton (ice hockey) (born 1957), Canadian ice hockey executive
Bruce Hamilton (ophthalmologist) (1901–1968), Australian ophthalmologist
Bruce Hamilton (public servant) (1911–1989), Australian senior public servant
Bruce Hamilton (rugby union) (born 1923), Australian rugby player